Naresh Joshi is a former Nepal international footballer. Naresh Joshi holds the record as he is first and only hat trick scorer for Nepal in SAFF Championship. He scored 3 goals in Nepal's 3–2 victory against Sri Lanka which helped Nepal to proceed to the semifinal in SAFF 1999 played at India. Naresh Joshi played three years for the Nepal national football team and his club career included clubs like Three Star Club, Friends club and RCT.

References

Living people
Year of birth missing (living people)
Place of birth missing (living people)
Nepalese footballers
Nepal international footballers
Association footballers not categorized by position
Footballers at the 1998 Asian Games
Asian Games competitors for Nepal
South Asian Games medalists in football
South Asian Games silver medalists for Nepal
20th-century Nepalese people